Choi Jin-young (born 24 August 1979) is a South Korean former professional tennis player.

Choi represented South Korea at the 2002 Asian Games and played in seven Fed Cup ties for her country.

As a professional player, Choi spent her career on the ITF circuit, where she won three singles and eight doubles titles. She reached a best singles ranking of 378 and was ranked as high as 266 in the world for doubles.

ITF Finals

Singles (3–2)

Doubles (8-4)

References

External links
 
 
 

1979 births
Living people
South Korean female tennis players
Tennis players at the 2002 Asian Games
Asian Games competitors for South Korea
21st-century South Korean women